The 1987–88 Primera División de Fútbol Profesional season is the 37th tournament of El Salvador's Primera División since its establishment of the National League system in 1948. The tournament was scheduled to end in December 1988. Aguila were crowned champions without the need of playing a final, as they were the best team in the regular and championship round.

Teams

Managerial changes

During the season

League standings

Final round standings

Top scorers

List of foreign players in the league
This is a list of foreign players in 1987-1988. The following players:
have played at least one apetura game for the respective club.
have not been capped for the El Salvador national football team on any level, independently from the birthplace

Acajutla
  Eraldo Correia
   Asdrúbal Padin
  Raul Esnal

C.D. Águila
  Néstor Doroni 
  João Cabral 
  Juan Carlos Carreño
  Luis Güelmo

Alianza F.C.
  Óscar Biegler 
  Ruben Alonso
  Carlos Reyes
  Hernán Sosa

Atletico Marte
 

Chalatenango
  Arnaldo Martínez
  Marco Pereira

 (player released mid season)
  (player Injured mid season)
 Injury replacement player

Cojutepeque
 

C.D. FAS
  Manolo Álvarez 
  Rogelio Flores 
  Roberto Montepeque
  Héctor Cedrés 
  Julio César Tejeda

C.D. Luis Ángel Firpo
  Rubén Darío Plaino

Metapan
  Clemente Uruguay Gussoni

Once lobos

External links
 
 
 
 

1987
1986–87 in Salvadoran football